The National Film Board of Canada (NFB) is Canada's public film and digital media producer and distributor. An agency of the Government of Canada, the NFB produces and distributes documentary films, animation, web documentaries, and alternative dramas. In total, the NFB has produced over 13,000 productions since its inception, which have won over 5,000 awards. The NFB reports to the Parliament of Canada through the Minister of Canadian Heritage. It has bilingual production programs and branches in English and French, including multicultural-related documentaries.

History

Canadian Government Motion Picture Bureau

The Exhibits and Publicity Bureau was founded on 19 September 1918, and was reorganized into the Canadian Government Motion Picture Bureau in 1923. The organization's budget stagnated and declined during the Great Depression. Frank Badgley, who served as the bureau's director from 1927 to 1941, stated that the bureau needed to transition to sound films or else it would lose its access to theatrical releases, but the organization did not gain the equipment until 1934, and by then it had lost its theatrical distributors. Badgley was able to get a 16 mm film facility for the bureau in 1931. The bureau was reorganized into the National Film Board of Canada on 11 June 1941, following John Grierson's recommendation.

Foundation and early history

Ross McLean was working as the secretary to High Commissioner Vincent Massey when he met Grierson, and asked for Grierson to come to Canada to aide in the governmental film policy. Grierson made a report on the Canadian film industry in 1938, and the National Film Act, which he drafted, was passed on 2 May 1939 causing the creation of the NFB. The position of Film Commissioner was left vacant for months, as Ned Corbett declined the appointment, until Grierson, who proposed Badgley and Walter Turnbull for the position, accepted the position for six months in October 1939, but served until 1945. Grierson selected McLean to work as assistant commissioner and Stuart Legg to oversee the productions. Grierson sent in a letter of resignation on 27 November 1940, in protest of the CGMPB and NFB not being merged, but agreed to stay on for another six months and the merger happened. Employment rose from 55 to 787 from 1941 to 1945, although it was cut by 40% after the war ended.

The Case of Charlie Gordon was the NFB's first English-language film and Un du 22e was its first French-language film. In 1944, Grierson established twelve units to handle production; The World in Action and Canada Carries On, Industrial Relations, Health and Rehabilitation, Newsreel and Armed Forces, Animation, Dominion-Provincial, Travel and Outdoors, Armed Services, Foreign Language Programme, French Language Programme, Agriculture, and Education. Employees were contracted for three months as Grierson believed that job security hurt organizational creativity, but most employees worked longer than three months.

Grierson made efforts to increase the theatrical distribution of NFB films, primarily its war-related films, as he was coordinating wartime information for the United Kingdom in North America. Famous Players aided in distribution and the Canadian Motion Picture War Services Committee, which worked with the War Activities Committee of the Motion Pictures Industry, was founded in 1940. NFB productions such as The World in Action was watched by 30-40 million people per month in the United Kingdom and United States in 1943, and Canada Carries On was watched by 2.25 million people by 1944. The audience for NFB newsreels reached 40-50 million per week by 1944.

Grierson opposed feature film production as he believed that Canada did not have a large enough market for an independent feature film industry. He supported working with American film companies and stated that "the theatre film business is an international business, dependent when it comes to distribution on an alliance or understanding with American film interests". He travelled to Hollywood in 1944, and the NFB sent scripts to American companies for consideration.

Norman McLaren founded the NFB's animation unit in 1942, and had George Dunning, René Jodoin, Wolf Koenig, Jean-Paul Ladouceur, Evelyn Lambart, Colin Low, Grant Munro, and Robert Verrall working there within a decade of its creation.

Ross McLean administration

Grierson lacked strong support in the Canadian government and some of his films received opposition from members of the government. Inside Fighting Russia was criticized for its support of the Russian Revolution and Balkan Powderkeg for criticizing the United Kingdom's policy in the Balkans. Grierson and the NFB were attacked during the onset of the Cold War. The Federal Bureau of Investigation created a file on Grierson in 1942, due to the World in Action newsreel being considered too left-wing. Leo Dolan, an ally of Hepburn and the head of the Canadian Government Travel Bureau, accused Grierson of being Jewish and a Co-operative Commonwealth Federation supporter. The Gouzenko Affair implicated Freda Linton, one of Grierson's secretaries, and the organization was criticized by the Progressive Conservative Party for subversive tendencies, financial waste, and being a monopoly. Grierson was also accused of being involved, but was proven not to be.

During McLean's tenure film production was divided into four units in 1948. Unit A dealt with agriculture, non-English, and interpretative films, Unit B dealt with sponsored, scientific, cultural, and animated films, Unit C dealt with theatrical, newsreels, tourist, and travel films, and Unit D dealt with international affairs and special projects. This system continued until its abolition on 28 February 1964 when it had seven units, five English-language and two French-language.

In 1947, Grant McLean, the cousin of the NFB commissioner, shot The People Between and the Secretary of State for External Affairs's department stated that some parts of the film were too favorable towards the Chinese Communist Party. Quebec Premier Maurice Duplessis had NFB films removed from schools using accusations of communism.

The Royal Canadian Mounted Police discovered that an employee for the NFB's Production Division, who was a communist, took photos of top-secret military equipment. The Department of National Defence prohibited the NFB from making films for it. Ross McLean followed the recommendations of the department and declared the NFB a vulnerable agency and the RCMP requested the firing of 36 employees. The RCMP requested him to fire a list of employees, McLean refused to fire any employees without their disloyalty being proven. He was not reappointed as commissioner and replaced by William Arthur Irwin in 1950. Irwin reduced the demand and only three were fired.

Irwin administration

Irwin, the editor of Maclean's, was selected to replace McLean as commissioner of the NFB. The Financial Post, one of the NFB's leading critics and the sister publication of Maclean's, stopped its criticism following Irwin's selection and Kenneth Wilson, one of the NFB's strongest critics, died in a plane crash although Floyd Chalmers, the president of Maclean-Hunter, criticized Irwin for leaving Maclean's.

Film production was centralized under Irwin by having one person oversee the four film units. He selected Donald Mulholland over James Beveridge and Mulholland was criticized for ignoring French-language film production. Unit E, dealing with sponsored work, and Unit F, dealing with French-language films, were created in 1951.

The Royal Commission on National Development in the Arts, Letters and Sciences, with Massey as its chair, was formed in 1949. The NFB submitted a brief asking to have a headquarters constructed, budget increases, and to become a Crown corporation. Robert Winters, whose ministry oversaw the NFB, stated that its brief did not represent government policy. The Association of Motion Picture Producers and Laboratories of Canada submitted a brief criticizing a government monopoly, with the NFB's crown corporation request being referred to as an "expansionist, monopolistic psychology", and that they were unable to compete with the NFB as it paid no taxes and was exempt from tariffs. The commission's report supported the NFB and its requests for Crown corporation status and a headquarters were accepted.

In 1950, Irwin wrote to Robert Winters about a report on restructuring the NFB and Winters told Irwin to rewrite the 1939 Film Act as it was outdated by then. The National Film Act was passed in June, and took effect on 14 October.

A Canadian tour by Princess Elizabeth and Prince Philip was filmed using 35 mm Eastman colour-film stock, which was not available to the public yet. The film was initially meant to be two reels, worth twenty minutes, but grew to five reels as they could not determine what to cut. Irwin met with Harvey Harnick, the NFB's Columbia theatrical distributor, and J.J. Fitzgibbons, the president of Famous Players, and Fitzgibbons told Irwin that he would screen all five reels if the film was completed for a Christmas release. Royal Journey opened in seventeen first-run theatres and over course of the next two years it was screened in 1,249 Canadian theatres where it was watched by a record two million people and the film was also screened in forty other countries. The film cost $88,000, but the NFB gained a profit of $150,000 and the film's success was one of the reasons Grierson stated that Irwin "saved the Film Board".

The NFB created its first television series, Window on Canada and On the Spot, with the CBC in 1953. However, the CBC opposed increasing the amount of NFB productions as they believed it was hurting CBC's growth. The majority of the filmmakers in the NFB opposed moving into television. Sydney Newman and Gordon Burwash, who supported moving into television, were sent to the United States in 1948 to learn about TV production and NBC was given the right to air NBC productions in exchange. When Newman and Burwash returned they joined the CBC as the NFB was unable to move into television. Half of all productions by the NFB were made to air on television by 1955. In 1956, the CBC's exclusion grew to them making Hawkeye and the Last of the Mohicans with the expressed prohibition of NFB involvement and rejecting a show by the NFB based on Jake and the Kid.

Trueman administration

Irwin resigned as commissioner in May 1953, and later stated that he wanted to be more involved in film production, but his time was being taken up by administrative purposes. Albert Trueman, president of the University of New Brunswick and a member of the board of governors of the NFB and CBC, was selected by Winters to replace Irwin. A reshuffling of the cabinet had Walter Edward Harris become the new minister responsible for the NFB.

Since the foundation of the NFB its offices were divided across multiple locations in Ottawa and plans created during World War II to construct a single headquarters were not acted upon. Montreal was selected during Irwin's administration due to it bilingualism and two Canadian Broadcasting Corporation television stations being created there. Prime Minister Louis St. Laurent reached an agreement with Duplessis to allow the move. Donald Mulholland, the director of production, ended his support for the relocation to Montreal after Irwin's resignation and argued against it. Trueman did not take a position and instead sent the information to Harris. St. Laurent was angered by this and asked Winters if Trueman was attempting to sabotage the relocation and Trueman told Winters that he was just giving Harris information about the situation. The Conservatives criticized the rising cost of the headquarters' construction and attempted to block it, but failed. The building was constructed from 1953 to 1956, at a cost of $5.25 million and served as the NFB's headquarters until 2019.

In September 1954, Quebec censors demanded that the NFB pay a censorship fee of $20,500 per year and Trueman wanted to accept it in order to avoid controversy. However, a compromise was reached where the Quebec censors were given one print of each film and if they censored it then all versions would be also censored while the NFB would pay an annual fee between $2,500-3,000.

Pierre Juneau, who was sent to the United Kingdom by Irwin, was brought by Trueman to the NFB as an adviser and secretary in 1953. The creation of two assistant commissioners, one English and one French, with Juneau as the French assistant commissioner was proposed in November 1954, but was rejected by Jack Pickersgill, who replaced Harris, over the course of the next three years. André Laurendeau criticized the NFB for not creating a French-language side. In February 1957, Pickersgill allowed for Juneau to become the executive director and be in charge of financial administration and distribution. This was criticized by Montréal-Matin, Le Devoir, L'Action catholique, and other French-language media and Juneau was criticized for demoting Roger Blais, who claimed it was for him criticizing the salary inequality between French and English speakers.

Roberge administration

Trueman accepted the position of commissioner with the promise that he would later be given a more prestigious position. He resigned during the French media criticism to become head of the Canada Council in 1957. He suggested Gérard Pelletier as his successor, but Guy Roberge, a former Liberal member of the Legislative Assembly of Quebec who had written sections of the Massey report, was selected instead as the first French-Canadian commissioner. Le Devoir supported his selection and the French media ended its criticism of the NFB.

Ellen Fairclough, who became the minister responsible for the NFB in May 1958, was not interested with the organization and never saw a film created by the NFB. She declined to interfere in NFB matters despite criticism from Pickersgill, who believed that the minister was responsible for whatever went on at the NFB.

Upon his arrival at the NFB in 1953, Juneau saw the difficulties of communication between French and English speakers and supported creating separate English and French production units. Additional units for French-language film production were created in 1958. A French-language branch of the NFB that was independent of its English-language productions was formed on 1 January 1964, under the leadership of Pierre Juneau. One-third of the NFB's budget was given to French-language productions.

Drylanders, the organization's first English language feature-length fiction film, was released in 1963. In February 1964, the English-language production units were replaced by a talent pool system where producers had less power and directors had more power. The French-language production units were replaced in September 1968. The pool system lasted until its replacement by the studio system in 1971.

In 1962, Roberge proposed the creation of an organization to aid in film finance based on the National Film Finance Corporation and Centre national du cinéma et de l'image animée. The Interdepartmental Committee on the Possible Development of a Feature Film Industry in Canada, under Roberge's leadership, was formed by the secretary of state. The committee submitted a report to the 19th Canadian Ministry for the creation of a loan fund to aid the development of the Canadian film industry. The proposal was approved in October 1965, and legislation, the Canadian Film Development Corporation Act of 1966-67, for its creation was introduced in June 1966, before being approved on 3 March 1967, establishing the Canadian Film Development Corporation.

Denys Arcand, Gilles Carle, Jacques Godbout, Gilles Groulx, and Clément Perron criticized the NFB and its productions in articles written for the Cité Libre. Juneau stated that the articles were a watershed moment in the NFB's history. The men were reprimanded by Roberge. Many employees left the NFB following the reprimands including Michel Brault, Carle, Bernard Gosselin, Groulx, and Arthur Lamothe.

Juneau left the NFB in March 1966, and worked at the Canadian Radio-television and Telecommunications Commission before becoming president of the CBC. Roberge created the positions of Assistant Government Film Commissioner, held by Grant McLean and Roland Ladouceur, Director of Production for English, held by Julian Biggs, and French, held by Marcel Martin, productions.

Grant McLean administration
Roberge resigned as commissioner on 1 April 1966, and declined to be involved with the selection of his successor. Grant was appointed as the acting commissioner by Judy LaMarsh. LaMarsh was slow on the selection of a permanent commissioner. Grierson supported Grant's selection, but also put forward Newman. Hugo McPherson was selected to become commissioner in April 1967.

Maurice Lamontagne selected Gordon Sheppard, a film producer, to review Canada's cultural policy and his report, Sheppard's Special Report on the Cultural Policy and Activities of the Government of Canada, was critical of the NFB. It criticized the NFB's preference for aesthetics and cultural films instead of informational films. The report called for a reduction in NFB productions and that it should eventually be entirely replaced by private production. The External Affairs Ministry criticized Sheppard stating that he was serving his own interests.

Prior budgets were created by having the commissioner meet with the secretary of state and representatives of the Treasury before being voted on in parliament, but it was changed to having members of the Standing Committee on Broadcasting, Films and Assistance to the Arts question the commissioner and Grant was the first commissioner to go through it.

There had been multiple attempts by the NFB to create a film school and the idea received support from the External Affairs Ministry and the Sheppard Report. However, the Treasury Board of Canada had rejected efforts to fund its creation. Grierson was invited by Grant to report on the possibility of creating a film school. Grierson supported creating a school, if the External Affairs Ministry recommended that production be reduced to free up creative teachers.

The CBC terminated its contracts with the NFB in 1966. The CBC and NFB's relations soured due to the NFB's demand that no commercials be played during their films and the NFB charging $10,000–$15,000 for 30 minute films while a commercial network had received it for $800. The CBC and NFB also co-produced The Ernie Game and Waiting for Caroline which went overbudget by $50,000 and $200,000 respectively.

McPherson administration

In 1967, the Treasury Board limited the NFB's expenditures to $10 million and over the course of two years it was forced to pay for built-in higher salary costs and another salary increase due to an agreement with the SGCT union using existing funds. McPherson asked Pelletier to allow the NFB to spend over $500,000 more than its budget in order to avoiding firing 10% of the NFB's employees, and later asked the Cabinet and Treasury for more funding, but was unsuccessful. McPherson later stated that after his failure with the Treasury he waited for the perfect time to resign.

In 1969, an agreement was reached between the CBC and NFB in which the CBC would be allowed to air commercials during NFB programs. Revenue from sponsored films declined from $2.2 million to $1.6 million by August 1969.

McPherson announced that 10% of the employees would be laid off by 1 January 1970. The employees formed a Crisis Committee under John Howe's leadership and film production was stopped although a strike was not officially called. The committee suggested allowing government sponsors to choose between using the NFB or private companies, allowing outsiders to pay for NFB technical services, creating a unit system where 5-15 people would work together, and creating fees for distribution. McPherson supported the idea of distribution fees and thought that it was the only viable option for the NFB. Pelletier approved the NFB charging $3–12 per day for its films, but they were later removed as being in violation of anti-inflation guidelines. Fees would be instituted in 1988.

The Treasury had granted $1 million, $250,000 less than what was requested, in August to cover NFB's salary increases, but McPherson was not informed as ministers hoped he would institute larger budget cuts. An additional $500,000 was free due to lowered production following the Crisis Committee's formation. 63 layoffs were proposed and it was reduced by 17 due to union opposition.

The NFB's computer animation program was suspended due to budget cuts although the NFB's French Animated Studio, founded by René Jodoin in 1966, created Peter Foldes's Metadata in 1971, and the Hunger in 1973. The NFB returned to computer animation in the 1980s. The first usage of videotape by the NFB occurred in 1967, when Claude Jutra and Robert Forget used it for research with children.

Newman and Lamy administrations

Newman, a former NFB director who spent the previous twelve years working on television shows in the United Kingdom, was selected to replaced McPherson as commissioner in 1970, and he selected André Lamy as his assistant commissioner. Faulkner opposed Newman and worked to have Newman not reappointed in July 1975, and he was replaced by Lamy.

Lamy criticized multiple French productions, such as Cotton Mill, Treadmill, 24 heures ou plus, and Un pays sans bon sens!, as being too biased or separatist and were ordered to not be released in 1970. Robin Spry was initially denied the ability to film the events of the October Crisis by the English side of the NFB, but was given permission by the French side and the footage was turned into Reaction: A Portrait of a Society in Crisis and Action: The October Crisis of 1970 with some elements censored by Newman. French films banned under Newman's tenure were later released during Lamy's tenure.

Kathleen Shannon attempted to have a division created to focus on films made by and about women due to the coming International Women's Year. Newman and Robert Verrall supported Shannon's attempt to get a $1.3 million budget for a women's department, but it was rejected by the Treasury. Verrall gave Shannon permission to organize Studio D, the first publicly funded feminist film-production unit in the world, in 1974. However, there would be no French version of Studio D until the formation of Studio B in 1986. Studio D produced 125 films before its closure in 1996.

In 1970, Pelletier called for the creation of a Canadian Film Commission, made up of private and governmental interests, but it was opposed by the NFB, CBC, CFDC, and Library and Archives Canada. However, they did agree to form the Advisory Committee on Film as an ad hoc committee. Pelletier later proposed the Global Film Policy in which the NFB would regionalize and share sponsored productions with the private sector. Pelletier's successor, Hugh Faulkner, replaced the Global Film Policy with the Capital Cost Allowance in which investors could get a 100% tax deduction.

Faulkner proposed to shift the responsibility of sponsored films to the Department of Supply and Services and only give the NFB 30% of the work. However, he was replaced by John Roberts during a shuffling of the cabinet in September 1976. Roberts believed that the CCA resolved the funding problems for the private industry, accepted Lamy's recommendations for interactions with private companies, and declined to have the Department of Supply and Services manage sponsored films. However, 70% of the sponsored work were given to private companies by the end of Lamy's tenure.

A $500,000 budget cut and 2.5% decrease in salaries over two years were implemented in 1975, after initially being threatened with a $1 million cut, as part of a government attempt to save $1 billion. The Public Service Staff Relations Board ruled in 1977 that 99% of the freelance workers at the NFB were employees and the board of governors later recommended the firing of sixty-five people. Federal budget cuts caused Roberts to plan for the NFB's budget to decrease by 10% between 1979 and 1981.

Domville administration
Lamy left the NFB and the board of Governors selected James de Beaujeu Domville, who served as deputy film commissioner for seven years, after four months. Domville selected François N. Macerola, the director of French production, as his deputy commissioner. Domville offered to continue on as commissioner for another term after 1984, and his demands were accepted by the board of governors, but chose to leave after Francis Fox declined to accept or deny his renewal.

After the 1979 election Prime Minister Joe Clark changed the ministry responsible for the NFB from the Secretary of State, which managed it since 1963, to the Minister of Communications, then led by David MacDonald. MacDonald supported giving 80% of the sponsored work to private companies and that the NFB only make films that the private companies could not. Domville offered a three-year phase out of NFB doing sponsored work during a meeting with representatives of the Canadian Film and Television Association and Association des Producteurrs de Films du Quebec in 1979. He stated that "sponsored film had become a monkey on the back of English production".

Encyclopædia Britannica reportedly offered to buy the NFB for $100 million in 1979.

Fox organized the Applebaum-Hébert Committee under the leadership of Louis Applebaum and Jacques Hébert in 1981. It was the first review of cultural institutions and policies since the Massey Commission. The committee released its report on 15 November 1980, in which it called for the elimination of the government's role in producing and distributing cultural products and to instead give it to the private industry. They believed that the private industry could create an export market to compete with the United States. Fox later decided to allow the NFB continue producing content, but ended their involvement in sponsored content, along with their executive production of sponsored work given to private companies.

Macerola administration
Domville suggested Patrick Watson as his successor and the board of governors accepted him, but Fox declined as he wanted his Film and Video Policy to be considered by the cabinet first. Macerola became the acting commissioner of the NFB. Watson was instead appointed to the board of governors and became president of the CBC in 1989. Macerola left the NFB six months before the expiration of his term in order to join Lavalin in December 1988, and Joan Pennefather became the acting commissioner.

Macerola oversaw a reorganization of the NFB which decreased its distribution offices from twenty-six to twelve and international offices to three. The NFB attempted to create a television channel in the 1980s. Marcel Masse gave them permission to attempt to create Young Canada Television (Tèlè-Jeunesse Canada), but the channel failed in June 1987, as the Department of Communications withdrew its financial support leading to the banks to also withdraw their support. Macerola's Five-Year Operational Plan saw the permanent staff of the NFB fall from 1,085 in 1982, to 728 in 1989, and the amount of work given to freelancers by 1986 was 67% for English productions and 57% for French productions.

The NFB was given a honourary Oscar at the 61st Academy Awards in honour of its fiftieth anniversary.

Documentary

Cinéma vérité and Direct Cinema
In the post-war era, the NFB became a pioneer in new developments in documentary film. The NFB played a key role in both the cinéma vérité and direct cinema movements, working on technical innovations to make its 16 mm synchronized sound equipment more light-weight and portable—most notably the "Sprocketape" portable sound recorder invented for the film board by Ches Beachell in 1955. Influenced by the work of Henri Cartier-Bresson, the NFB's Studio B production unit experimented with cinema verite in its 1958 Candid Eye series. Candid Eye along with such NFB French-language films as Les Raquetteurs (1958) have been credited as helping to inspire the cinéma vérité documentary movement. Other key cinéma vérité films during this period included Lonely Boy (1961) and Ladies and Gentlemen... Mr. Leonard Cohen (1965).

Challenge for Change/Societé Nouvelle

Running from 1967 to 1980, Challenge for Change and its French-language equivalent Societé Nouvelle became a global model for the use of film and portable video technology to create community-based participatory documentary films to promote dialogue on local issues and promote social change. Over two hundred such films were produced, including 27 films about Fogo Island, Newfoundland, directed by Colin Low and early NFB efforts in Indigenous filmmaking, such as Willie Dunn's The Battle of Crowfoot (1968).

Indian Film Crew

The Indian Film Crew was an early effort in First Nations filmmaking at the NFB, through its Challenge for Change program, initially proposed by the associate director of the CYC, Jerry Gambill, according to Noel Starblanket.  George Stoney was brought in as the first executive producer of Challenge for Change. It was jointly sponsored by the Company of Young Canadians and the Department of Indian Affairs. Barbara Wilson, Tom O’Connor, Noel Starblanket, Roy Daniels, Morris Isaac, Willie Dunn, and Mike Kanentakeron Mitchell were on Canada’s first all-Indigenous production unit, making groundbreaking work that helped galvanize Indigenous movements across the continent.

Giant-screen cinema
NFB documentarians played a key role in the development of the IMAX film format, following the NFB multi-screen experience In the Labyrinth, created for Expo 67 in Montreal. The film was the centrepiece of a $4.5 million pavilion, which attracted over 1.3 million visitors in 1967, and was co-directed by Roman Kroitor, Colin Low and Hugh O'Connor, and produced by Tom Daly and Kroitor. After Expo, Kroitor left the NFB to co-found what would become known as IMAX Corporation, with Graeme Ferguson and Robert Kerr. The NFB continued to be involved with IMAX breakthroughs at subsequent world's fairs, with NFB director Donald Brittain directing the first-ever IMAX film Tiger Child for Expo 70 in Osaka, and with the NFB producing the first full-colour IMAX-3D film Transitions for Expo 86 in Vancouver and the first 48 fps IMAX HD film Momentum for Seville Expo '92.

Alternative drama
In the 1980s, the National Film Board also produced a number of "alternative drama" films, which combined documentary and narrative fiction filmmaking techniques. Generally starring non-professional actors, these films used a documentary format to present a fictionalized story and were generally scripted by the filmmakers and the cast through a process of improvisation, and are thus classified as docufiction.

The alternative drama films were The Masculine Mystique (1984), 90 Days (1985), Sitting in Limbo (1986), The Last Straw (1987), Train of Dreams (1987), Welcome to Canada (1989) and The Company of Strangers (1990).

Animation

When Norman McLaren joined the organization in 1941, the NFB began production of animation. The animation department eventually gained distinction, particularly with the pioneering work of McLaren, an internationally recognized experimental filmmaker. The NFB's French-language animation unit was founded in 1966 by René Jodoin.

Drawn-on-film animation
When McLaren joined the NFB, his first film at the film board was the drawn-on-film short, Mail Early. He would go on to refine his technique make a series of hand-drawn films at the NFB during and after the Second World War, most notably Boogie-Doodle (1940), Hen Hop (1942), Begone Dull Care (1949) and Blinkity Blank (1955).

Pinscreen animation
The NFB was a pioneer in several novel techniques such as pinscreen animation, and as of June 2012, the NFB is reported to have the only working animation pinscreen in the world.

Stop-motion animation
McLaren's Oscar-winning Neighbours popularized the form of character movement referred to as pixilation, a variant of stop motion. The term pixilation itself was created by NFB animator Grant Munro in an experimental film of the same name. In 2015, the NFB's animation studios were credited as helping to lead a revival in stop-motion animation in Canada, building on the tradition of NFB animators such as McLaren and Co Hoedeman.

Computer animation
The NFB was a pioneer in computer animation, releasing one of the first CGI films, the Oscar-nominated Hunger, in 1974, then forming its Centre d'animatique in 1980 to develop new CGI technologies. Staff at the Centre d'animatique included Daniel Langlois, who left in 1986 to form Softimage.

The NFB was licensed by IMAX Corporation to develop new artistic applications using its SANDDE system for hand-drawn stereoscopic computer animation, with the NFB producing a number of films including Falling in Love Again (2003) and Subconscious Password (2013).

Traditional animation
Traditional animators included Richard Condie, John Weldon, Alison Snowden, Janet Perlman, Cordell Barker, Brad Caslor, Michael Mills, Paul Driessen among others (some draw on paper rather than cels).

Sand animation
Caroline Leaf used this technique on films such as The Metamorphosis Of Mr. Samsa and The Owl Who Married A Goose. The Sand Castle was the first (and so far only) sand animation to win an Oscar.

Paint on glass animation
Wendy Tilby animated Strings using paint (gouache mixed with glycerine) on glass. This ‘under the camera’ technique was invented and perfected by Caroline Leaf in her film The Street.

Interactive

Works
As of March 2013, the NFB devotes one quarter of its production budget to interactive media, including web documentaries. The NFB is a pioneer in interactive web documentaries, helping to position Canada as a major player in digital storytelling, according to transmedia creator Anita Ondine Smith, as well as Shari Frilot, programmer for Sundance Film Festival's New Frontier program for digital media.

Welcome to Pine Point received two Webby Awards while Out My Window, an interactive project from the NFB's Highrise project, won the IDFA DocLab Award for Digital Storytelling and an International Digital Emmy Award.

Loc Dao is the executive producer and "creative technologist" responsible for NFB English-language digital content and strategy, based in the Woodward's Building in Vancouver. Jeremy Mendes is an interactive artist producing English-language interactive works for the NFB, whose projects include a collaboration with Leanne Allison (Being Caribou, Finding Farley) on the webdoc Bear 71.

Dao's counterpart for French-language interactive media production at the NFB is Hugues Sweeney, based in Montreal. Sweeney's recent credits include the online interactive animation work, Bla Bla.

Virtual reality
The NFB is also recognized as a leader in virtual reality, with works such as the Webby Award-winning The Unknown Photographer, Way to Go and Cardboard Crash.

Platforms
In January 2009, the NFB launched its online Screening Room, NFB.ca, offering Canadian and international web users the ability to stream hundreds of NFB films for free as well as embed links in blogs and social sites. By mid-2013, the NFB's digital platforms had received approximately 41 million views.

In October 2009, the NFB launched an iPhone application that was downloaded more than 170,000 times and led to more than 500,000 film views in the first four months. In January 2010, the NFB added high-definition and 3D films to the over 1400 productions available for viewing online. The NFB introduced a free iPad application in July 2010, followed by its first app for the Android platform in March 2011. When the BlackBerry PlayBook launched on April 19, 2011, it included a pre-loaded app offering access to 1,500 NFB titles. In January 2013, it was announced that the NFB film app would be available for the BlackBerry 10, via the BlackBerry World app store.

In September 2011, the NFB and the Montreal French-language daily Le Devoir announced that they would jointly host three interactive essays on their websites, ONF.ca and ledevoir.com. The NFB is a partner with China's ifeng.com on NFB Zone, the first Canadian-branded web channel in China, with 130 NFB animated shorts and documentary films available on the company's digital platforms. NFB documentaries are also available on Netflix Canada.

In April 2013, the NFB announced that it was "seeking commercial partners to establish a subscription service for Internet television and mobile platforms next year. The service would be available internationally and would feature documentaries from around the world as well as the NFB’s own catalogue." As of April 2015, NFB.ca offered VOD films from partners Excentris and First Weekend Club along with NFB productions, with over 450 English and French VOD titles scheduled to be added in 2015.

Indigenous production
On June 20, 2017, the NFB announced a three-year plan entitled "Redefining the NFB's Relationship with Indigenous Peoples" that commits the organization to hiring more Indigenous staff, designating 15% of its production spending for Indigenous works and offering cross-cultural training to all employees. The plan also sees the NFB building on its relationships with Canadian schools and organizations to create more educational materials about Indigenous peoples in Canada.

One of the most notable filmmakers in the history of the NFB is Alanis Obomsawin, an Abenaki director who will be completing her 50th film with the NFB in 2017.

Programs 
One of the earliest programs were the Indian Film Crews (1968–70, 1971–73) under the Challenge for Change program, mentioned above also.

Inuit film and animation
In November 2011, the NFB and partners including the Inuit Relations Secretariat and the Government of Nunavut introduced a DVD and online collection entitled Unikkausivut: Sharing Our Stories, makes over 100 NFB films by and about Inuit available in Inuktitut and other Inuit languages, as well as English and French.

In November 2006, the National Film Board of Canada and the Inuit Broadcasting Corporation announced the start of the Nunavut Animation Lab, offering animation training to Nunavut artists. Films from the Nunavut Animation Lab include Alethea Arnaquq-Baril's 2010 digital animation short Lumaajuuq, winner of the Best Aboriginal Award at the Golden Sheaf Awards and named Best Canadian Short Drama at the imagineNATIVE Film + Media Arts Festival.

First Stories and Second Stories
In 2005, the NFB introduced its "First Stories" program for emerging Indigenous directors from Alberta, Saskatchewan and Manitoba. Twelve five-minute films were produced through the program, with four from each province. First Stories was followed by "Second Stories," in which three filmmakers from the previous program—Gerald Auger, Tessa Desnomie and Lorne Olson—were invited back to create 20 minute films.<

Wapikoni Mobile 
The NFB was a founding partner in Wapikoni Mobile, a mobile film and media production unit for emerging First Nations filmmakers in Quebec.

Women's production
The NFB has been a leader in films by women, with the world's first publicly funded women's film's studio, Studio D, followed subsequently by its French-language equivalent, Studio des femmes. Beginning on March 8, 2016, International Women's Day, the NFB began introducing a series of gender parity initiatives.

Studio D

In 1974, in conjunction with International Women's Year, the NFB created Studio D on the recommendation of long-time employee Kathleen Shannon. Shannon was designated as Executive Director of the new studio—the first government-funded film studio dedicated to women filmmakers in the world— which became one of the NFB's most celebrated filmmaking units, winning awards and breaking distribution records.

Notable films produced by the studio include three Academy Award-winning documentaries I'll Find a Way (1977), If You Love This Planet (1982) and Flamenco at 5:15 (1983), as well as Not a Love Story (1982) and Forbidden Love: The Unashamed Stories of Lesbian Lives (1992). Studio D was shut down in 1996, amidst a sweeping set of federal government budget cuts, which impacted the NFB as a whole.

As of March 8, 2016, researchers and librarians at the University of Calgary announced an archival project to preserve records of Studio D.

Gender parity initiatives
On March 8, 2016, NFB head Claude Joli-Coeur announced a new gender-parity initiative, with the NFB committing that half of all its production spending will be earmarked for films directed by women. The following year, the NFB announced that it also plans to achieve gender balance by 2020 in such creative positions as editing, scriptwriting, musical composition, cinematography and artistic direction. As of 2017, 53% of its producers and executive producers are women, as well as half of its administrative council.

While it is claiming success, directing credits and budget shares have barely changed. In 2016–2017, 44 per cent of NFB productions were directed by women (compared to 51 per cent directed by men and five per cent by mixed teams). Budget-wise, 43 per cent of production funds were given to projects led by women (vs. 40 per cent to projects directed by men and 15 per cent to ones overseen by mixed teams). In 2018–2019, 48% of NFB works were directed by women (38% by men and 14% by mixed teams), and 44% of the NFB production budget was allocated to works created by women (41% for works by men and 15% for works by mixed teams).  Production personnel are between 10 and 25%.

Training
NFB training programs include:

Animation
Hothouse,  a program for emerging animators that marked its tenth anniversary in 2015. Notable Hothouse alumni include Academy Award nominee Patrick Doyon, part of its 2006 edition. Cinéaste recherché(e) is a similar program for French-language emerging animators. Past graduates include Michèle Cournoyer, who took part in the program's 9th edition in 1989.

Theatrical documentaries
A collaboration with the Canadian Film Centre on a theatrical documentary development program. First launched in January 2009, the program has led to the production of Sarah Polley’s Stories We Tell, Yung Chang‘s The Fruit Hunters and Su Rynard’s The Messenger. In May 2015, the CFC and NFB announced a new version of the program entitled the NFB/CFC Creative Doc Lab.

NFB structure

Branches and studios
As of 2015, the NFB is organized along the following branches:
Director General, Creation and Innovation: René Bourdages. The heads of the NFB's English and French production branches are Michelle van Beusekom and Michèle Bélanger, respectively.
Finance, Operations and Technology: Director General: Luisa Frate
Marketing and Communications: Director General: Jérôme Dufour
Digital Platforms: Chief Digital Officer: Loc Dao.
Human Resources: Director General: François Tremblay

With six regional studios in English Program:
Digital Studio in Vancouver, headed by Executive Producer Rob McLaughlin
Animation Studio based in Montreal, headed by Executive Producer Michael Fukushima and Producers Maral Mohammadian and Jelena Popović
Atlantic Centre based in Halifax, headed by Executive Producer Annette Clarke and Producer Paul McNeill
Quebec Centre based in Montreal, also headed by Executive Producer Annette Clarke
Ontario Centre based in Toronto, headed by Executive Producer Anita Lee and Producer Lea Marin
North West Centre based in Edmonton, headed by Executive Producer David Christensen and Producer Bonnie Thompson
Pacific and Yukon Centre based in Vancouver, headed by Executive Producer Shirley Vercruysse.
With small satellite offices in Winnipeg and St. John's.

And four regional studios in French Program:
Interactive Studio in Montreal, headed by Executive Producer Hugues Sweeney
Ontario and West Studio based in Toronto, headed by Executive Producer: Jacques Turgeon
Quebec Studio based in Montreal, also headed by Executive Producer: Jacques Turgeon
French Animation and Youth Studio based in Montreal, headed by Executive Producer: Julie Roy and Producer: Marc Bertrand
Studio Acadie/Acadia Studio based in Moncton, headed by Executive Producer: Jacques Turgeon and Producer: Maryse Chapdelaine
René Chénier, formerly head of French Animation, is Executive Producer of Special Projects

Former studios and departments

Still Photography Division
Upon its merger with the Canadian Government Motion Picture Bureau in 1941, the NFB's mandate expanded to include motion as well as still pictures, resulting in the creation of the Still Photography Division of the NFB.

From 1941 to 1984, the Division commissioned freelance photographers to document every aspect of life in Canada. These images were widely distributed through publication in various media.

In 1985, this Division officially became the Canadian Museum of Contemporary Photography.

The division's work is the subject of a 2013 book by Carleton University art professor Carol Payne entitled The Official Picture: The National Film Board of Canada’s Still Photography Division and the Image of Canada, 1941-1971, published by the McGill-Queen's University Press.

Facilities in Montreal and Toronto
As part of the 2012 budget cuts, the NFB announced that it was forced to close its Toronto Mediatheque and Montreal CineRobotheque public facilities. They ceased to operate as of September 1, 2012. In September 2013, the Université du Québec à Montréal announced that it had acquired the CineRobotheque for its communications faculty.

People

Government Film Commissioners
As stipulated in the National Film Act of 1950, the person who holds the position of Government Film Commissioner is the head of the NFB. As of December 2014, the 16th commissioner of the NFB is Claude Joli-Coeur, who first joined the NFB in 2003 and had previously served as interim commissioner.

Past NFB Commissioners

 John Grierson, 1939–1945
 Ross McLean, 1945–1947 (interim), 1947–1950
 W. Arthur Irwin, 1950–1953
 Albert W. Trueman, 1953–1957
 Guy Roberge, 1957–1966
 Grant McLean, 1966–1967 (interim)
 Hugo McPherson, 1967–1970
 Sydney Newman, 1970–1975
 André Lamy, 1975–1979
 James de Beaujeu Domville, 1979–1984
 François N. Macerola, 1984–1988
 Joan Pennefather, 1988–1994
 Sandra M. Macdonald, 1995–2001
 Jacques Bensimon, 2001–2006
 Tom Perlmutter, 2007 to 2013.

Notable NFB filmmakers, artisans and staff

 Michel Brault
 Donald Brittain
 Richard Condie
 John Grierson, NFB founder
 Guy Glover, producer
 Co Hoedeman
 René Jodoin, French animation founder
 Kalle Lasn
 Arthur Lipsett
 Colin Low
 Bill Mason
 Norman McLaren, animation founder
 Grant Munro
 Alanis Obomsawin
 Gudrun Parker
 Ishu Patel
 Eldon Rathburn, composer
 Terence Macartney-Filgate
 Marcel Carrière
 Tom Daly
 Roman Kroitor
 Wolf Koenig
 Ryan Larkin
 Tanya Ballantyne
 Anne Claire Poirier
 William Greaves
 Stanley Jackson
 Boyce Richardson
 Michael Spencer

Awards

Film and television awards
Over the years, the NFB has been internationally recognized with more than 5000 film awards. In 2009, Norman McLaren's Neighbours was added to UNESCO's Memory of the World Programme, listing the most significant documentary heritage collections in the world.

Canadian Screen Awards
The NFB has received more than 90 awards from the Canadian Film Awards, the Genie Awards and the Canadian Screen Awards, including a Special Achievement Genie in 1989 for its 50th anniversary. The following is an incomplete list:

Winners:

Nominated:

Academy Awards
The National Film Board of Canada has received 12 Academy Awards to date. It has received 74 Oscar nominations, more than any film organization in the world outside Hollywood. The first-ever Oscar for documentary went to the NFB production, Churchill's Island. In 1989, it received an Honorary Award from the Academy "in recognition of its 50th anniversary and its dedicated commitment to originate artistic, creative and technological activity and excellence in every area of filmmaking." On January 23, 2007, the NFB received its 12th and most recent Academy Award, for the animated short The Danish Poet, directed by Torill Kove and co-produced with MikroFilm AS (Norway). 55 of the NFB's 75 Oscar nominations have been for its short films.

Winners:

Nominated: (incomplete list)

Golden Sheaf Awards
The NFB has received more than 110 Golden Sheaf Awards from the Yorkton Film Festival.  The following is an incomplete list of the winners.

Winners:
1960: Best of Festival, Universe, (Roman Kroitor, Colin Low) 
1964: Best of Festival, The Edge of the Barrens, 
1967: Best of Festival, Paddle to the Sea, (Bill Mason)
1969: Best of Festival, Pas de deux, (Norman McLaren)
1971: Best of Festival, Blake, (Bill Mason); Best Social Film; Best Direction, (Bill Mason)
1975: Best of Festival, Man Who Chooses the Bush, (Tom Radford);  Best Documentary; Best Direction (Tom Radford); Best Cinematography (Tony Westman)
1975: Best Animation, Hunger / La Faim, (Peter Foldes)
1975: Best Direction, Man Who Chooses the Bush, (Tim Radford)
1977: Best of Festival, High Grass Circus, (Tony Ianzelo)
1977: Best Animation, Mindscape (Le paysagiste), (Jacques Drouin)
1979: Best Animation, Blowhard, (Brad Caslor, Christopher Hinton)
1979: Best Experimental, Travel Log, (Donald Winkler)
1981: Best Direction (film), After the Axe, (Sturla Gunnarsson)
1982: Best Direction (Film), End Game in Paris, (Veronika Soul); Best Direction (Veronika Soul)
1984: Best Animation, The Boy and the Snow Goose / Le Petit Garçon et l'Oie des neiges, (Gayle Thomas)
1984: Best Experimental, Narcissus / Narcisse, (Norman McLaren)
1986: Best of Festival, Ikwe, (Norma Bailey); Best Drama Over 30 Minutes; Best Script (Wendy Lill); Best Editing (Lara Mazur)
1986: Best Direction, Sonia, (Paul Baillargeon)
1986: Best Drama Under 30 Minutes, The Concert Stages of Europe, (Giles Walker) 
1988: Best of Festival, Foster Child, (Gil Cardinal); Best Documentary Over 30 Minutes; NFB Kathleen Shannon Award
1988: Best of Festival, L'emprise, (Michel Brault); Best Direction, (Michel Brault)
1988: Best Animation, The Man Who Planted Trees / L'homme qui plantait des arbres, (Frédéric Back)
1988: Kathleen Shannon Award Foster Child, (Gil Cardinal)
1989: Best of Festival, The Defender, (Stephen Low); Best Cinematography/Videography (Charles Konowal); Best Direction, (Stephen Low); Best Script, (Stephen Low)
1989: Best Animation, La lettre d'amour,
1990: Best Drama Over 30 Minutes, Oui Allo! Estelle?, (Francois Dauteuil)
1990: Kathleen Shannon Award, Black Mother Black Daughter, (Sylvia Hamilton, Claire Prieto)
1991: Best of Festival, Island of Whales, (Mike Poole)
1991: Best Drama for Broadcasters, Le Vendredi de Jeanne Robinson, (Yves Dion)
1992: Best Animation, Sabina, (Katherine Li)
1994: Best of Festival, Folk Art Found Me, (Alex Busby )
1996: Best of Festival, Place of the Boss: Utshimassits, (John Walker); Best Documentary over 30 minutes; Best Original Music
1996: Best Animation, The Sandbox, (JoDee Samuelson)
1997: Best Animation, Ernie's Idea, (Peter Vogler, Claire Maxwell)
1998: Best of Festival, Chile, The Obstinate Memory / Chile, la memoria obstinada, (Patricio Guzman); Best Direction, (Patricio Guzman)
1998: Best Animation, Children Speak, (Bozenna Heczka, Georgine Strathy)
1999: Best Animation, Snow Cat, (Sheldon Cohen)
1999: Best Multicultural / Race Relations, Show Girls (Melilan Lam)
1999: Best Documentary Short Subject, Sunrise Over Tiananmen Square, (Shui-Bo Wang)
2000: Best Animation, My Grandmother Ironed the King's Shirts, (Torill Kove)
2001: Best Animation, The Boy Who Saw the Iceberg / Le garçon qui a vu l'iceberg, (Paul Driessen)
2001: Best Multicultural / Race Relations, Who Is Albert Woo?, (Hunt Hoe)
2002: Best Animation, Glasses, (Brian Duchscherer)
2003: Best Animation, Loon Dreaming / Le rêve du huard, (Iriz Pääbo)
2003: Best Multicultural / Race Relations, The Murdered Bride, Claude Vickery
2004: Best of Festival, Hardwood, (Hubert Davis); Best Documentary Short Subject; Best Direction (Non-Dramatic), (Hubert Davis);  Best Editing, (Hubert Davis)
2004: Best Animation, Stormy Night, (Michele Lemieux)
2004: Best Multicultural, TOTEM: The Return of the G'psgolox Pole, (Gil Cardinal)
2005: Best Animation, The Man With No Shadow / , (Georges Schwizgebel)
2005: Best Aboriginal, Two Worlds Colliding, (Tasha Hubbard)
2005: Best Multicultural / Race Relations, In the Shadow of Gold Mountain, (Karen Cho)
2005: Best Documentary Short Subject, Cheating Death, (Eric Geringas)
2006: Best Aboriginal, First Stories - Patrick Ross, (Ervin Chartrand)
2006: Best Aboriginal, First Stories - Apples & Indians, (Lorne Olson)
2006: Best Aboriginal, First Stories - Nganawendaanan Nde'ing / I Keep Them in My Heart, (Shannon Letrandre)
2006: Best Aboriginal, First Stories - My Indian Name, (Darryl Nepinak)
2006: Best Animation, John and Michael, (Shira Avni)
2006: Best Multicultural, Between: Living in the Hyphen, (Anne Marie Nakagawa)
2007: Best Aboriginal, Qallunaat! Why White People Are Funny, (Mark Sandiford, Zebedee Nungak)
2007: Best Animation, The Danish Poet / Le poète danois , (Torill Kove)
2007: Best Experimental, The Sparky Book, (Mary Lewis)
2007: Best Multicultural, Reema: There and Back, (Paul-Émile d'Entremont)
2009: Best Animation, The Necktie / Le noeud cravate), (Jean Françcois Lévesque)
2010: Best Animation, Runaway, (Cordell Barker)
2010: Best Emerging Filmmaker, The Man Who Slept (Inés Sedan)
2011: Best Aboriginal, Lumaajuuq, (Alethea Arnaquq-Baril)
2011: Best of Festival, Lipsett Diaries / Les journaux de Lipsett, (Theodore Ushev); Best Animation; The Founders' Award
2011: Best Direction, Higglety Pigglety Pop! or There Must Be More to Life, (Chris Lavis, Maciek Szczerbowski)
2011: Best Experimental, Mamori, (Karl Lemieux)
2012: Best Animation,Wild Life, (Amanda Forbis, Wendy Tilby)
2013: Best of Festival,  Let the Daylight Into the Swamp, (Jeffrey St. Jules); Best Experimental
2013: Best Direction Non-Fiction, The Portrait, (Lea Marin)
2014: Best Aboriginal, Timuti, (Jobie Weetaluktuk)
2014: Best Animation, Gloria Victoria, (Theodore Ushev)
2014: Best Director Fiction, Thomas, (Pedro Pires, Robert Lepage); Best Drama
2015: Best Animation, Me and My Moulton, (Torill Kove)
2016: Best Animation, Carface, (Claude Cloutier)
2016: Best Experimental, Mobilize / Mobiliser, (Caroline Monnet)
2016: Best Multicultural, The Red Path, (Thérèse Ottawa)
2017: Best Animation, Oscar, (Marie-Josée Saint-Pierre)
2017: Kathleen Shannon Award, 19 Days, (Asha Siad, Roda Siad)
2018: Best of Festival, Skin for Skin, (Kevin D.A. Kurytnik & Carol Beecher); Best Animation
2018: Best Experimental, The Tesla World Light, (Matthew Rankin)
2018: Best Indigenous, Holy Angels, (Jay Cardinal Villeneuve)
2018: Kathleen Shannon Award, Birth of a Family, (Tasha Hubbard)
2018: Ruth Shaw (Best of Saskatchewan), Talking at Night, (Eric Thiessen)
2019: Best Animation, Bone Mother, (Sylvie Trouvé, Dale Hayward)
2019: Kathleen Shannon Award, Beauty, (Christina Willings)
2020: Best Animation, The Physics of Sorrow, (Theodore Ushev); Best Director Fiction
2020: Best Direction Non-Fiction, Shannon Amen, (Chris Dainty)
2020: Best Experimental, No Objects / Sans objets, (Marc Betrand)
2020: Best Indigenous, Now is the Time, (Christopher Auchter)
2020: Best Multicultural, nîpawistamâsowin: We Will Stand Up, (Tasha Hubbard)
2020: Best Short Subject, Gun Killers, (Jason Young)

Peabody Awards
As of April 2014, the NFB has received five Peabody Awards, for the web documentary A Short History of the Highrise, co-produced with The New York Times; the Rezolution Pictures/NFB co-production Reel Injun (2011); Karen Shopsowitz's NFB documentary My Father's Camera (2002), the NFB/Télé-Action co-produced mini-series The Boys of St. Vincent (1995) and the NFB documentary Fat Chance (1994).

Annie Awards
NFB Annie Awards nominations include:

Nominated:  (incomplete list)
2011: Annie Award for Best Animated Short Subject, Sunday (Dimanche), (Patrick Doyon)
2011: Annie Award for Best Animated Short Subject, Wild Life, (Wendy Tilby and Amanda Forbis).

Interactive awards
In June 2011, NFB received the Award of Excellence in Interactive Programming from the Banff World Media Festival. In August 2011, the NFB received an outstanding technical achievement in digital media award from the Academy of Canadian Cinema & Television.

Webby Awards
As of 2016, NFB web documentaries have won 17 Webby Awards, presented International Academy of Digital Arts and Sciences for excellence on the internet. Filmmaker-in-Residence, a project by Katerina Cizek about St. Michael's Hospital in Toronto, was named best online documentary series at the 2008 Webbys. In 2010, the NFB website Waterlife, on the state of the Great Lakes, won in the Documentary: Individual Episode category. In 2011, Welcome to Pine Point received two Webbys, for Documentary: Individual Episode in the Online Film & Video category and Net art in the Websites category. In 2012, the NFB received two more Webbys, for Bla Bla (best web art) and God's Lake Narrows (best use of photography). In 2013, Bear 71 received the Webby for best net art. In 2014, the interactive photo essay The Last Hunt received a People’s Voice Award Webby for best navigation/structure. In 2015, the NFB-co-produced webdoc Seven Digital Deadly Sins received three People's Voice Awards, chosen by the public online, at the 2015 Webby Awards.

At the 2016 awards, the NFB received six more Webbys: Way to Go received the Webby and People's Voice awards in the Web/NetArt category as well as the Webby for Online Film & Video/VR: Gaming, Interactive or Real-Time. The Unknown Photographer won the People's Voice award in the Online Film & Video/VR: Gaming, Interactive or Real-Time category, while Universe Within received the Webby for Online Film & Video/Best Use of Interactive Video, and Cardboard Crash VR for Google Cardboard won in the category of Online Film & Video/VR: Gaming, Interactive or Real-time (Branded).

Others

Controversy
In addition to Neighbours, other NFB productions have been the source of controversy, including two NFB productions broadcast on CBC Television that criticized the role of Canadians in wartime led to questions in the Senate of Canada.

In the early 1970s, two Quebec political documentaries, Arcand's On est au coton and Gilles Groulx's 24 heures ou plus, were initially withheld from release by the NFB due to controversial content.
 
The Kid Who Couldn't Miss (1982) cast doubt on the accomplishments of Canadian World War I flying ace Billy Bishop, sparking widespread outrage, including complaints in the Senate subcommittee on Veterans' Affairs.

A decade later, The Valour and the Horror outraged some when it suggested that there was incompetence on the part of Canadian military command, and that Canadian soldiers had committed unprosecuted war crimes against German soldiers. The series became the subject of an inquiry by the Senate.

Other controversial productions included the 1981 film Not a Love Story: A Film About Pornography, a 1981 Studio D documentary critiquing pornography that was itself banned in the province of Ontario on the basis of pornographic content. Released the following year,  If You Love This Planet, winner of the Academy Award for best documentary short subject, was labelled foreign propaganda under the Foreign Agents Registration Act of 1938 in the United States.

NFB on TV
The NFB is a minority owner of the digital television channel, Documentary in Canada. NFB-branded series Retrovision appeared on VisionTV, along with the French-language Carnets ONF series on APTN. Moreover, in 1997 the American cable channel Cartoon Network created a weekly 30-minute show called O Canada specifically showcasing a compilation of NFB-produced works; the segment was discontinued in favour of Adult Swim.

Logo

The Board's logo consists of a standing stylized figure (originally green) with its arms wide upward. The arms are met by an arch that mirrors them. The round head in between then resembles a pupil, making the entire symbol appear to be an eye with legs. Launched in 1968, the logo symbolized a vision of humanity and was called "Man Seeing / L'homme qui voit". It was designed by Georges Beaupré. It was updated in 2002 by the firm of Paprika Communications.

NFB in popular media
The Scottish music act Boards of Canada takes its name from the NFB.
George Lucas, who had attributed the origins of "the Force " to a 1963 abstract NFB film by Arthur Lipsett entitled 21-87, went on to use the number 2187 as the cell number where Princess Leia was being detained in Star Wars.
Two NFB shorts, the Oscar-nominated Christmas Cracker and David and Hazel: A Study in Communication, were each spoofed by RiffTrax.
The Big Snit inspired a Scrabble scene in the second episode of The Simpsons' first season, "Bart the Genius".

See also
Cinema of Canada
Cinema of Quebec
From NFB to Box-Office
Documentary Organization of Canada

References

Works cited

Further reading

Challenge for Change: Activist Documentary at the National Film Board of Canada (2010). Thomas Waugh, Michael Brendan Baker, Ezra Winton (eds). Montreal-Kingston: McGill-Queens University Press.

External links

 
 National Film Board of Canada at the Big Cartoon DataBase

 
Organizations awarded an Academy Honorary Award
Canadian animation studios
Federal departments and agencies of Canada
Department of Canadian Heritage
Film archives in Canada
Film distributors of Canada
Film production companies of Canada
Producers who won the Best Documentary Short Subject Academy Award
Organizations based in Montreal
Government agencies established in 1939
Organizations established in 1939
Film organizations in Canada
Documentary film organizations
Peabody Award winners
State-owned film companies
Digital media organizations
Virtual reality organizations
1939 establishments in Quebec
Inkpot Award winners
Academy Award for Technical Achievement winners